Tiddas is the first and only live album by Australian three-piece folk group Tiddas. It is also the group's final recording with the group disbanding shortly after its release in May 2000. The album was recorded live at the Continental Café in Prahran, over two nights in September 1999. The album was released in late 1999.

Reception
Deadly Magazine said "The album is a celebration of a decade of making music, defying trends and forging friendships all around the world." adding "The album features 11 new tracks filled with classic Tiddas passions: peace, families, politics, women's issues and most important of all, love.. [and this is] their best work yet."

Track listing

See also
 Show Us Your Tiddas!, a 2007 play written and performed by Lou Bennett and directed by Rachael Maza that follows Bennetts life, telling stories such as her coming out to her family, her first live performance, moving to the city and her time with Tiddas.

References

1999 albums
Live albums by Australian artists
Tiddas (band) albums